Demoulia ventricosa, common name : the blunt demoulia, is a species of sea snail, a marine gastropod mollusk in the family Nassariidae, the Nassa mud snails or dog whelks.

There is one subspecies: Demoulia ventricosa nataliae Kilburn, 1972

Description
The shell size varies between 17 mm and 27 mm

The ovate shell is slightly cylindrical and is blunted at its summit. The short spire is flattened. It is composed of five whorls. The two last whorls are much more swollen, and covered upon their whole surface with very fine and very close transverse striae. The suture is very apparent, and a little canaliculated. The white aperture is ovate, narrowed at its upper part and dilated inferiorly. The outer lip is thin and is ornamented interiorly with numerous transverse striae. The smooth columella is arcuated at its base and is covered throughout its whole length with the inner lip, the base of which is a little thicker. The surface of this shell is reddish or violet-colored, with wide, reddish spots. It is ornamented at the upper part of the whorls, and along the suture, with a white band, alternating with irregular deeper spots.

Distribution
This marine species occurs off False Bay, South Africa, and Mozambique.

References

 Cernohorsky W. O. (1984). Systematics of the family Nassariidae (Mollusca: Gastropoda). Bulletin of the Auckland Institute and Museum 14: 1–356.

External links
 

Nassariidae
Gastropods described in 1816